Kayvon Zand is an American nightlife personality and musician based in NYC. They are most known for eccentric live performances and parties, as well as their established personal style featuring John Sex hair and Elvis Presley jump suits. They are the founder of Zandwagon, a model management and specialty casting company.

Background 
Kayvon Zand is a first-generation American born to Persian parents Tabandeh Zand Ph.D and Hormoze Goudarzi in Wilmington, North Carolina. Zand was brought up in a single parent household by their mother, learning Persian before English. About their family background Zand has said, "My family situation seems like a soap opera. I grew up with my mom and sister, whom I love dearly. Recently I tried to reach out to my father and my other half-siblings but was turned away. It's probably one of the most hurtful things I've had to deal with." Zand is descended from the Zand dynasty on their mother's side. In their teens, Zand worked as a fashion model, which allowed them to leave their hometown and travel Europe.

Nightlife 

Zand became a notable fixture in New York City nightlife after moving there from North Carolina. They are the "ringleader" of the Zand Collective, a performance group of a dozen members. In July 2010 they gained attention when their act was banned from the Highline Ballroom, as the venue deemed their act to be too shocking.

They were nominated for a Paper Magazine award in 2012, and they are known for throwing extravagant parties. Their dark, dance party, Dorian Gray, ran for the year of 2013, causing a controversy in the LES when the original venue for the party, the DL, came under fire from the local community board. The DL claimed they fired Zand because they were unaware they were throwing a dance party. Zand moved Dorian Gray to the Bowery Electric for its duration, and the party continued to receive favorable press.

In 2014 Zand began a new event called Sex Fifth Avenue. The first edition took place at the Museum of Sex, where it was successful in cementing Zand's reputation for revitalizing NYC nightlife. Zand proceeded to launch Kayvon Zand's Metropolis at Webster Hall across 2016-2017.

Zand has partnered with the Eventi Kimpton Hotels & Restaurants to throw a popular, celebrity studded  Halloween event in 2016. The event was first named Hospital 849 in 2016, followed by Beast 849 in 2017 and Manor 849 in 2018. Preproduction is underway for Zand's 2019 event, Voodoo 849. After taking 2020 off due to the COVID-19 pandemic, Zand's popular 849 party returned in 2021 with an Edward Gorey themed event titled Gorey 849.

Music 

Zand creates '80s inspired electronic dance music. They write their own music, but work with producers including Chew Fu and Gomination to create the final tracks. They are a self-taught pianist, and also plays the violin and viola.

Zand performed at the Life Ball in Vienna in 2011. They have also released two EPs; the One Way Flight remix package (2012) and Just Give It Away (2014). Zand was featured in Paper Magazine's music issue in 2012. Zand has created one music video for each of their EPs. One Way Flight and Just Give It Away were both directed by Mike Ruiz and have both received favorable press, being launched by Interview Magazine  and Wild Magazine  respectively. Zand headlined the Jersey City Pride festival in 2021.

Acting 

Zand has been both a film and a stage actor. They played a terrorist in RuPaul's film Starrbooty, Elvis Presley on an episode of the popular Japanese show The World's Astonishing News and starred in Alfred Preisser and Randy Weiner's "Caligula Maximus-Featuring Kayvon Zand", produced by Stephen Pevner. Zand was interviewed in Glory Daze:The Life and Times of Michael Alig.

News coverage 
Zand is known for their extravagant, blonde bouffant. They have been published in many magazines as themself; notably Interview Magazine, Glamour Paris, and Italian Vanity Fair. Kayvon has also shot with Steven Meisel for Vogue. Zand was featured as themself in the 2012 commercial for the Volkswagen Golf. Zand was interviewed by The Huffington Post for their "After Dark" series examining the history of and current state of NYC nightlife. Zand performed at a benefit concert for victims of the 2015 East Village gas explosion held at Theater 80 in April 2015. Zand appeared on an episode of the RTL Television docudrama Larissa Goes To Hollywood starring Larissa Marolt. Zand appeared on America's Got Talent Season 10, making it to judge cuts. They were eliminated after a contentious exchange with the four judges who were overwhelmingly negative in their evaluations. Zand authored a response as a new blogger for the Huffington Post.

Zandwagon
In June 2017, Zand launched "Zandwagon", a model management and specialty casting company. According to Zand, the model management company (which represents a diversity of talent including Buck Angel, Stevie Boi, and a cast of striking individuals representing a spectrum from 18 to 72, many ethnicities, as well as transgender and cisgender people), fills a necessary void. "Queer is freedom. It's openness. It's real. And I think that's what we want from society. We don't want people to play dress-up anymore. We don't want appropriation. We want the real deal. And that's what Zandwagon is going to provide. We're going to break beauty standards—one booking at a time.”

Personal life
In the Huffington Post blog entry in which Zand reflected on their negative experience with America's Got Talent, Zand identifies themself as a "queer artist" and an "eccentric [person] [...] in the LGBT community." Later in the blog entry, Zand states, "I don't live my life by the gender norm, and I cannot take this off when I leave the stage to blend in and be a normal person, and [...] life in general is a struggle because of this."

Zand is married to their longtime partner, Anna Zand. They have three children; Zara, Aslan and Atlas Zand. The Zand family was featured in Nylon Magazine as professional artists adjusting to new parenthood. Anna Zand was quoted, "You know, I feel like having a daughter really pushes me harder to be a more accomplished human being. Because I don’t want her to like, look at her home and be like, ‘Yeah well, you know, my mom gave up on that so I’m not going to try to do it either.’"

References

External links 
Official Website

Year of birth missing (living people)
Living people
American people of Iranian descent
American socialites
America's Got Talent contestants
American LGBT singers
LGBT people from North Carolina